Attila Korsós  (born 25 December 1971 in Győr) is a Hungarian former football player.

World Cup 2002 Qualifier
From 2000 to 2001, Attila Korsós participated in four World Cup qualifying matches for Hungary.

Career in NBII
In 2003, he left FC Fehérvár (which was playing in the NB1) and went to Gyirmot SE (a football team playing in the Hungarian second division).
In the season 2005/06 he managed to score 20 goals in 27 matches with Gyirmót SE in NB II.

Career honours
Hungarian League: 1998

Personal life
His father, István Korsós, was also a footballer.

References

External links

hlsz.hu
footballplus.com
Hungarian Cup
Hungarian National Championship I
fifa.com

1971 births
Living people
Hungarian footballers
Hungary international footballers
Fehérvár FC players
Újpest FC players
Győri ETO FC players
Association football midfielders
Gyirmót FC Győr players
Integrál-DAC footballers
FC Red Bull Salzburg players
People from Győr